Duti Monor Jonak ( The Two Sides Love ) was a most successful Assamese romantic drama series that premiered on 3 August 2020 on Rang TV. It's produced by Har Govinda Mahanta under HGM Films. Starred Munmi Phukan, Sukanya Rajguru, Sidharth Kalita, Upasona Priyam, and Komol Lusan.

Cast 
Season - 1

Munmi Phukon as Kasturi
Sukanya Rajguru as Nidhi
Guna Borah as om
 Sidhant Kalita as Aryan
 Joli Laskar as Anjali
Jyoti Narayan Nath as Tejas
Manami Bezbaruah as Biswajit Ojah
Nayan Jyoti Gogoi as Nayan

Season - 2

Upasana Priyam as Kasturi 
Komal Lusan as Brikam

References 

Indian drama television series